Slaná is a municipality and village in Semily District in the Liberec Region of the Czech Republic. It has about 700 inhabitants.

Administrative parts
Villages of Bořkov, Hořensko, Nedvězí, Sutice and Světlá are administrative parts of Slaná.

History
The first written mention of Slaná is from 1430.

References

Villages in Semily District